Jošavka Gornja (Cyrillic: Јошавка Горња) is a village in the municipality of Čelinac, Republika Srpska, Bosnia and Herzegovina.

Population

In the Census Years of 1981 and 1971 Jošavka Donja and Jošavka Gornja were the unique settlement.

References

Populated places in Čelinac
Villages in Republika Srpska